The Orchid Villa (Vila orhideja) is a Croatian film directed by Krešo Golik. It was released in 1988.

External links
 

1988 films
Croatian drama films
1980s Croatian-language films
Yugoslav drama films
Films directed by Krešo Golik